Peter Jeremy Piers Goldberg (born 1958) is an English historian. He is Reader in Medieval History at the University of York. Goldberg was educated at the University of York and at the University of Cambridge. His main interest lies within the social and cultural history of late medieval England, in particular women's and gender history. Among his published books are Women, Work and Life Cycle in a Medieval Economy (1992), Women in England c. 1275-1525: Documentary Sources (1995) and Medieval England: A Social History 1250-1550 (2004). He has also edited several books, including Women in Medieval English Society (1997) and Richard Scrope: Archbishop, Rebel, Martyr (2007).

External links
Home page at the University of York
Author information at Macmillan

1958 births
English historians
British medievalists
Academics of the University of York
Living people
Alumni of the University of York
English male non-fiction writers